Teliphasa albifusa is a species of moth of the family Pyralidae. It is found in China (Fujian, Guangxi, Hebei, Henan, Hubei, Hunan, Shanxi, Sichuan, Tianjin, Yunnan, Zhejiang), Taiwan, Japan, Korea and India (Sikkim, Nagas).

The wingspan is 34–38 mm.

References

Moths described in 1896
Epipaschiinae
Moths of Asia